Jacinta Cormier, sometimes credited as Jace Cormier, is a Canadian singer and actress from Newfoundland and Labrador. She is most noted for her performance as Mary Cameron in the film Life Classes, for which she received a Genie Award nomination for Best Actress at the 9th Genie Awards in 1988.

Originally from Stephenville, Cormier was active on the music scene in St. John's as a pianist and vocalist, including with the Wonderful Grand Band, before being cast in Life Classes. She subsequently appeared in a supporting role in the film Finding Mary March, but returned to music and did not have any other significant film or television roles.

In 2001 she toured a stage show in which she played Marlene Dietrich, and released her first album as a recording artist.

References

External links

20th-century Canadian actresses
20th-century Canadian pianists
21st-century Canadian pianists
Canadian pop singers
Canadian film actresses
Canadian women pianists
Canadian musical theatre actresses
Actresses from Newfoundland and Labrador
Musicians from Newfoundland and Labrador
People from Stephenville, Newfoundland and Labrador
Franco-Newfoundlander people
Living people
Year of birth missing (living people)
20th-century Canadian women singers
21st-century Canadian women singers
20th-century women pianists
21st-century women pianists